Acleris schiasma is a species of moth of the family Tortricidae. It is found in Thailand.

The wingspan is about 14 mm. The ground colour of the forewings is white, preserved in the form of two costal spots. The dorsal and terminal areas are cream brownish and the rest of the wing is blackish grey, sprinkled with black. The markings are blackish grey with black edges marked by scales. The hindwings are brownish grey.

Etymology
The species name refers to the sombre colouration of the forewings and is derived from Greek  (meaning shade, obscurity).

References

Moths described in 2012
schiasma
Moths of Asia